Sigerfjord Church is a parish church of the Church of Norway in Sortland Municipality in Nordland county, Norway. It is located in the village of Sigerfjord on the island of Hinnøya. It is one of the three churches for the Sortland parish which is part of the Vesterålen prosti (deanery) in the Diocese of Sør-Hålogaland. The white, wooden church was built in a long church style in 1933 using plans drawn up by the architect Harald Sund. The church seats about 280 people. The church was consecrated on 17 May 1933.

See also
List of churches in Sør-Hålogaland

References

Sortland
Churches in Nordland
Wooden churches in Norway
20th-century Church of Norway church buildings
Churches completed in 1933
1933 establishments in Norway
Long churches in Norway